The Sinister Man is a 1961 British crime drama film directed by Clive Donner and starring Patrick Allen and John Bentley. It was one of the series of Edgar Wallace Mysteries, British second-features, produced at Merton Park Studios in the 1960s.

Plot
The body of an Oxford professor is found floating in the river Thames. He had previously been studying an archeological artefact known as the Kytang Wafers, and this is now missing. Scotland Yard investigates. The wafers are bits of ancient text that could alter the relations between Red China and a Tibetan type nation called "Kytang". An autopsy reveals that the professor was murdered by a karate blow.

Cast
 John Bentley as Superintendent Wills 
 Patrick Allen as Dr. Nelson Pollard 
 Gerald Anderson as Major Paul Amery 
 Edward Atienza as Clerk 
 Wilfrid Brambell as Lock keeper 
 Yvonne Buckingham as Miss Russell 
 Michael Deacon as Angus 
 Jacqueline Ellis as Elsa Marlowe 
 Keith Faulkner as Lock keeper's assistant 
 William Gaunt as Mitch Hallam 
 John Glyn-Jones as Dr. Maurice Tarn 
 Peter Hager as Warden 
 John Horsley as Pathologist 
 Burt Kwouk as Captain Feng 
 Arnold Lee as Soyok 
 Robert Lee as Nam Lee 
 Brian McDermott as Detective Sergeant Stillman
 Don McKillop as Reporter

Critical reception
MemorableTV.com described the film as "definitely one of the great Edgar Wallace entries with a fab cast that includes a pre-Steptoe Wilfred Brambell, Patrick Allen, William Gaunt and Burt Kwouk. John Bentley who took the lead as Superintendent Willis was a popular actor in the late fifties and early sixties but is all but forgotten these days"; while Classic Movie Ramblings wrote "The Sinister Man isn’t exactly a good movie but it has plenty of energy and a few intriguingly odd moments. I found it to be strangely appealing."

Home media
The film is included in Volume 2 of The Edgar Wallace Mystery series, released on region 2 DVD by Network, in 2012.

References

External links
 
 
 

1961 films
1961 crime drama films
British crime drama films
British black-and-white films
Films directed by Clive Donner
Edgar Wallace Mysteries
1960s English-language films
1960s British films